Dniproenergo is a major electric and thermal energy producing companies in central Ukraine. Until 2012 it was known as Dniproenergo.

Structure
It is a subsidiary of the Government of Ukraine (25%), while its managed by DTEK. The company has an installed capacity of 8,185 MW that represents around 16% of the country's total installed capacity.

 Kryvorizka Power Station
 Zaporizka Power Station
 Prydniprovska Power Station

See also

 Ministry of Fuel and Energy (Ukraine)

References 

SCM Holdings
Electric power companies of Ukraine
Companies based in Zaporizhzhia